Mount Annan Christian College is an independent non-denominational Christian co-educational early learning, primary and secondary day school, located in Mount Annan, a suburb in the region of Macarthur, New South Wales.

Mount Annan Christian College was founded as a ministry of C3 New Hope on 12 February 1999 in order to establish a leading Prep to Year 12 school in the heart of the Macarthur region, New South Wales.

Mount Annan Christian College is a member of Australian Independent Schools.Schools

Overview
The school consists of one large campus in the rural suburb of Mount Annan, and this campus facilitates the three sections of the school:

 Prep (Pre-Kindergarten)
 Primary School - Years K-6
 Secondary School - Years 7-12

College Board 
The following individuals are serving on the board of Mount Annan Christian College:

Principals
The following individuals have served as Principal of Mount Annan Christian College:

Building Projects 
MPH 

Year Completed 2016

Cost $1,000,000.00

Project Link MPH    
                    

MPH Teaching Spaces

Year Completed 2021

Cost $1,000,000.00

Project Link MPH Teaching Spaces

Admin Building 

Year Completed 2022

Cost N/A

Project Link 1 Admin Building 

Project Link 2 Finished Photos 

Stage 2 

Year Completed (Started)

Cost $5,000,000.00

Project Link 1 Stage 2 Planning

Stage 3 

Year Completed (Planning)

Cost $7,105,170.00

Project Link Stage 3 Planning

Curriculum

Primary school 
Kindergarten to Year 6 study the six Key Learning Areas: English, Mathematics, Science and Technology, Human Society and its Environment (HSIE), Creative Arts, Personal Development, Health and Physical Education (PDHPE).

Secondary school
In Stage 5 (Years 9 and 10), students study a program that comprises two elective classes and Christian Studies, as well as the courses mandated by NSW Education Standards (NESA). The compulsory core subjects are: English, Mathematics, Science, Australian History and Geography and PDHPE.

Electives are chosen from:

 Agricultural Technology 
 Commerce
 Food Technology
 Industrial Technology
 Music
 Physical Activity and Sports Studies (PASS)
 Visual Arts

In the final school stage (Years 11 and 12) students are prepared for the New South Wales Higher School Certificate. NSW Education Standards (NESA) requires Stage 6 students to study a minimum of 12 units in Year 11 and 10 units in Year 12 (All subjects are worth 2 units, except for extension courses, which are worth 1 unit ). HSC English is compulsory.

Students may choose from the following:

 Agriculture
 Biology
 Business Studies
 Chemistry
 Community and Family Studies (CAFS)
 English Standard, Advanced, Extension 1 and Extension 2
 Mathematics Standard 1 and 2, Advanced
 Food Technology
 Legal Studies
 Modern History
 Music 1
 Physical Development, Health and Physical Education (PDHPE)
 Physics
 Visual Arts

Outdoor Education
The Duke of Edinburgh's Award Scheme is offered to all students in Years 8-11 and students are encouraged to complete the three-year training involved.  Camping and hiking expeditions which are a compulsory element of the Scheme are undertaken during school time with options for domestic or international hikes.
Year 9 - Bronze Level
Year 10 - Silver Level
Year 11-12 - Gold Level

Sport
College sport allows students to choose team sports that they are interested in, such as

Basketball

Touch Football 

Oztag, 

Netball

Volleyball

Soccer

House system
Upon entry to the school, each student is allocated, according to age and gender, or family tradition, to one of the four Houses present on campus:

 

Houses form the basis for sporting and cultural competitions or interactions within the school.

Students can represent the College in a weekly interschool competition in a variety of sports throughout the entire year.  These competitions are a part of the Macarthur Independent Schools Association (MISA).  
 
The Macarthur Independent Schools Association is an association made up of Christian based schools in the south west of Sydney. Through this association, high school students participate in a number of sporting competitions and cultural events.

MISA Website

See also

 List of non-government schools in New South Wales

ABN Look Up

 

Nondenominational Christian schools in Sydney